Matthew John Mikulski (born May 8, 1999) is an American baseball pitcher in the San Francisco Giants organization. He played college baseball for the Fordham Rams. Mikulski was selected in the second round with the 50th overall pick of the 2021 Major League Baseball draft by the Giants.

Early life and amateur career
Mikulski was born and grew up in Mohegan Lake, New York. He was 5-8 and 175 pounds as a high school freshman, and attended John F. Kennedy Catholic High School for three years before transferring to Lakeland High School before his senior year. As a senior, he went 5-1 with a 1.07 ERA and 73 strikeouts and 28 hits allowed in  innings pitched.

Mikulski played baseball for the Fordham Rams. After his sophomore year in 2019, he played collegiate summer baseball for the Brewster Whitecaps of the Cape Cod Baseball League, where he posted a 1.86 ERA with 26 strikeouts in  innings pitched, and was named a league all-star. Mikulski went 2-1 with a 1.29 ERA and 18 strikeouts as a junior before the season was cut short due to the coronavirus pandemic. Mikulski went undrafted in the 2020 Major League Baseball draft despite being ranked the 203rd-best prospect by Baseball America and within the top 200 prospects by MLB.com. During his senior season, Mikulski committed to play in the Draft League, a summer collegiate league for 2021 MLB Draft prospects. He was also added to the watchlist for the Golden Spikes Award.

Mikulski finished his senior season with a 9-0 record on the mound with a 1.45 ERA (2nd in the conference) and 124 strikeouts (first) in  innings pitched with an 0.820 WHIP, 3.8 hits per nine innings, and 16.3 strikeouts per nine innings, and was named the Atlantic 10 Conference Baseball Pitcher of the Year. He threw a 94-97 mph fastball that touched 100 mph, an  86-88 mph slider, a changeup, and a 76-77 mph curveball. He was also named a unanimous All-America selection, First Team All-America by the NCBWA and American Baseball Coaches Association/Rawlings, Second Team by Collegiate Baseball and D1Baseball.com, and Third Team by Baseball America, First Team All-Atlantic 10, ABCA/Rawlings First Team All-Northeast Region, and the 2021 Vincent T. Lombardi Award winner as the top male athlete at Fordham.

Professional career
Mikulski was selected in the second round with the 50th overall pick of the 2021 Major League Baseball draft by the San Francisco Giants. He signed with the team on July 23, 2021, and received a $1.2 million signing bonus. He made his professional debut with the Rookie-level Arizona Complex League Giants with whom he pitched five innings in which he gave up one earned run.

References

External links

Fordham Rams bio

1999 births
Living people
Baseball players from New York (state)
Baseball pitchers
Brewster Whitecaps players
Fordham Rams baseball players
Arizona Complex League Giants players
San Jose Giants players